Kahnekuyeh (also Romanized as Kahnekūyeh, Kohan Kūyeh, and Kahnakūyeh; also known as Kahnakūyek) is a village in Kushk-e Qazi Rural District, in the Central District of Fasa County, Fars Province, Iran. At the 2006 census, its population was 305, in 77 families.

References 

Populated places in Fasa County